Matamata is a town in Waikato, New Zealand

Matamata, Mata-Mata or mata mata may also refer to:

New Zealand
 Matamata Ward, in the Matamata-Piako District
 Matamata Airport
 Matamata College, secondary school
 Matamata Swifts, football club
 Matamata (New Zealand electorate), former parliamentary electorate

Other uses
 Kampong Mata-Mata, village in Brunei
 Mata mata, freshwater turtle